Ryan Seaton (born December 7, 1979, Cynthiana, Indiana) is an American singer. He was the lead singer for Ernie Haase & Signature Sound, a Southern Gospel quartet, from 2003 to December 2009.

Raised in Poseyville, Seaton began singing in the choir at Christian Fellowship Church when he was still a teenager. His mother, Debbie Seaton, herself a musician, worked in a couple of Country gospel bands. He began his professional singing career with the Melody Boys Quartet in 2003, only to join Ernie Haase and Signature Sound ten months later, the latter of whom he remained with for six years. After Signature Sound, he recorded his own solo album, "The Stage is Bare", in May 2010, before founding the Union Street Quartet, along with Andrew Goldman, Toby Hitchcock and Aaron McCune. In 2014 he joined Cornerstone Church based quartet Canton Junction, where he remained until 2016.

References

Living people
1979 births
American performers of Christian music
Southern gospel performers
Singers from Indiana
People from Posey County, Indiana
21st-century American singers
21st-century American male singers